Connor's Cottage is situated on Piesse Street in Toodyay, Western Australia.

It was constructed about 1870 for Daniel Connor, a significant identity in the history of the development of the Toodyay town and district. The cottage is on one of the first large landholdings Connor acquired in the town site, on the corner of Stirling Terrace and Piesse Street. It is most likely the cottage was built by George Henry Hasell who also built the adjacent flour mill (Connor's Mill) for Connor around the same time. Another large residence (Connor's House) was built on the lot in about 1890. 

Connor's Cottage is a single storey, painted brick building with a corrugated iron roof. A verandah extends around much of the building. Whilst originally built as a dwelling, the building has also been used as a bakery and restaurant, and a number of extensions have taken place over the years. The origin of the alternative name, Ted Chapman's Cottage, has not been confirmed.

Today the Toodyay Visitor Centre is located in between Connor's Mill and Connor's Cottage.

References

Buildings and structures in Toodyay, Western Australia
Stirling Terrace, Toodyay